Krauka is a Viking folk band from Denmark formed in 1999. "Krauka's music is played on instruments reconstructed after archaeological findings, but modern elements interwine, creating an intense and often wild atmosphere inspired by the sagas and the Nordic forces of nature".

Discography 
 Vikinga Seidur 2002;
 Stiklur 2004;
 Bylur 2006;
 Oðinn 2009;
 Gjörningur 2012;
 Timinn Tifar 2015;
 Loka Leikur 2018;
 Eftir Orustuna 2019 (Trio Krauka).
 Heimkoma 2023

References 

Nordic folk musical groups
Musical groups established in 1999